Amy Reed McCune is an American ecologist and evolutionary biologist. She is a professor of ecology and evolutionary biology at Cornell University. McCune specializes in the history of life through the study of fishes. Her lab focuses on evolution with methodologies including paleobiology, phylogenetics, genetics and morphology.

McCune was appointed Senior Associate Dean of the Cornell College of Agriculture and Life Sciences in 2017. McCune is also a Faculty Curator of Ichthyology at the Cornell Museum of Vertebrates.

Education 
McCune received a Bachelor of Arts (A.B.) in biology from Brown University in 1976. McCune received a Doctor of Philosophy (Ph.D.) in biology from Yale University in 1982. McCune was a Miller Postdoctoral Fellow at the University of California, Berkeley (1982–1983).

Career 
McCune became an assistant professor at Cornell University in 1983.  McCune served as the chair of the Department of Ecology and Evolutionary Biology from 2011 to 2017. McCune is also a faculty curator of fishes at the Cornell University Museum of Vertebrates.

Selected publications 
 Lencer, E. S., M. Riccio and A. R. McCune. 2016. Changes in growth rates of oral jaw elements produce evolutionary novelty in Bahamian pupfish. Journal of Morphology 277: 935–47.
 Longo, S. J., M. Riccio, and A. R. McCune. 2013. Homology of lungs and gas bladders: insights from arterial vasculature. Journal of Morphology 274: 687–703.
 Cass, A. N., M. D. Servetnick, and A. R. McCune. 2013. Expression of a lung developmental cassette in the adult and developing zebrafish swimbladder. Evolution and Development 15(2): 119–132.
 Wagner, C. E., A. R. McCune, and I. J. Lovette. 2012. Recent speciation in sympatric Tanganyikan cichlid colour-morphs. Molecular Ecology 21: 3283–3292.
 McCune, A. R. and J. C. Schimenti. 2012. Using Genetic Networks and Homology to Understand the Evolution of Phenotypic Traits. Current Genomics 13(1): 74–84.
 Rabosky, D. and A. R. McCune. 2010. Reinventing species selection with molecular phylogenies.  Trends in Ecology and Evolutionary Biology 25(2): 68–74.
 Wagner, C. E. and A. R. McCune. 2009. Contrasting patterns of spatial genetic structure in sympatric rock-dwelling cichlid fishes.  Evolution 63(5): 1312–1326.
 McCune, A. R. 2004. Diversity and speciation of semionotid fishes in Mesozoic rift lakes.  In: Adaptive Speciation, U. Dieckman, M. Doebli, and J. A. J. Metz (eds.).  Cambridge University Press pp. 362–379.
 McCune, A. R. and R. L. Carlson. 2004. Twenty ways to lose your bladder: Common natural mutants in zebrafish and widespread convergence of swim bladder loss among teleost fishes.  Evolution and Development 6(4): 246–259.
 McClure, M. and A. R. McCune. 2003. Evidence for developmental linkage of pigment patterns with body size and shape in Danios (Teleostei:  Cyprinidae).  Evolution 57(8): 1863–1875.
 McCune, A. R., R. C. Fuller, A. A. Aquilina, R. M. Dawley, J. M. Fadool, D. Houle, J. Travis, and A. S. Kondrashov. 2002. A low genomic number of recessive lethals in natural populations of bluefin killifish and zebrafish.  Science 296: 2398–2401.
 McCune, A. R. and N. R. Lovejoy. 1998. The relative rate of sympatric and allopatric speciation in fishes: Tests using DNA sequence divergence between sister species and among clades.  In: Endless Forms: Species and Speciation, D. Howard and S. Berloccher (eds.).  Oxford University Press pp. 172–185.
 McCune, A. R. 1996. Biogeographic and stratigraphic evidence for rapid speciation in semionotid fishes.  Paleobiology 22(1): 34–48.
 Normark, B. B., A. R. McCune, and R. G. Harrison. 1991. Phylogenetic relationships of neopterygian fishes inferred from mitochondrial DNA sequences.  Molecular Biology and Evolution 8: 819–834.
 McCune, A. R. 1990. Morphological anomalies in the Semionotus complex: Relaxed selection during colonization of an expanding lake.  Evolution 44(1): 71–85.

Awards and honors 

 NSF grant for the Cornell University Museum of Vertebrates (2006–2008).
 NSF grant for the Cornell University Museum of Vertebrates (2002–2004).

References 

Living people
21st-century American women scientists
American ecologists
Women ecologists
Women evolutionary biologists
21st-century American biologists
American women biologists
Cornell University faculty
Yale University alumni
Brown University alumni
1954 births
American women academics